The Jingzhang Expressway (京张高速公路, Hanyu Pinyin: Jīngzhāng Gāosù Gōnglù) is a 79.2 kilometers (49.2 miles) expressway in China connecting Beijing and Zhangjiakou. It is a part of the Jingda Expressway from central Beijing to Datong, in Shanxi province. 

The Jingzhang Expressway is built to reduce traffic on the increasingly congested China National Highway 110, which runs from Beijing to Qingtongxia. The construction of it began in 1998 and was completed on November 16, 2002. 

The Jingzhang Expressway gets its name from the combination of one-character Chinese abbreviations for Beijing and Zhangjiakou (Beijing—Jing, Zhangjiakou—Zhang).

The expressway shortened the driving time between Beijing and Zhangjiakou from more than 3 hours to 2 hours. It is of great significance to improve the road network structure in Hebei Province, stimulate the economy along the route, and promote the economic development of Zhangjiakou area.

Route description

The Jingzhang Expressway is part of the Jingda Expressway and a part of the China National highway system, a network of trunk ways across mainland China. It stretches from the Beijing City Limits Toll Gate to Zhangjiakou, crossing through locations such as the Guanting Reservoir. While the expressway starts in Beijing, the majority of it runs within Hebei province. 

Basic Route: Badaling Expressway - Donghuayuan - Huailai - Xiahuayuan - Zhangjiakou

Currentlly, the entire expressway is complete and open to traffic.

History
The expressway was created in segments, starting in Hebei. The difficult part was how to get it across the Guanting Reservoir. Previously, traffic was supposed to make a detour, so as not to create a bridge across the reservoir. However, in the end, a bridge across the Guanting Reservoir was built and the expressway's total distance was thus shortened.

The Jingzhang Expressway's final segment—that linking it to the Badaling Expressway—was completed in November 2002. As of that moment, traffic could flow directly from Beijing through to Zhangjiakou in the form of a direct expressway. (Previously, traffic entered the expressway bound for Zhangjiakou only at the Tumu toll gate (now disused),  from Beijing.)

Mega Traffic Jam of October 2004

In October 2002 trucks carrying excessive loads, caused the initial traffic jam that broke down the entire expressway. These trucks were over capacity in their loads mainly supplying coal, due to the winter months approaching. Yet with their trucks at overcapacity, it was one of the main causes for the traffic jam that lasted 56+ hours.

Even though this initial traffic jam was solved, poor road conditions still persisted for years. And in August of 2010, one of the longest traffic jams ever recorded started that lasted for roughly 10+ days. Trucks carrying supplies to help road construction and ease congestion around the city were one of the main causes for the traffic jam. There were roughly 100,000 travelers that ended up stuck in the traffic jam. Throughout the whole traffic jam vendors came to sell food and water to drivers/passengers as they waited for the whole ordeal to be over

Potential trouble spots:
 Guanting service area
 Toll gates (on the expressway, not at the individual exits)
 Major checkpoint at Kangzhuang, Beijing

At the toll station in Daijiaying, and at every exit in the Beijing direction, road signs urged drivers to use China National Highway 110 instead of the Jingzhang Expressway. The traffic jam meant that traffic that would take two hours to travel from Zhangjiakou to Beijing now took nearly two days.

These traffic jams continued on and off well into 2005. As a result, a second expressway linking Beijing to Zhangjiakou is in the plans.

Reason for the jams: bureaucracy. At every change of jurisdiction, there was a toll gate where lorries not only paid their tolls but also underwent weight examinations. Trouble was, every province had different standards and did not recognise the certificates issued from toll gates in other provinces claiming that the lorries were not overloaded. Beijing enforced a very low tolerance and forced even passenger cars to undergo the weight examination.

If a lorry was overweight, it had to unload and pass through the test again. Few people cooperated, instead willing to sit it out by parking their lorries on the hard shoulder of the expressway. The average time it took for a lorry to get through the test varied: 5 – 50 minutes, depending on the results.

Road conditions

Speed limit
Most of the expressway has a speed limit of 110 km/h. Hillier terrain has a lower speed limit of 80 km/h. The Guanting Bridge has a maximum speed limit of 80 km/h. Speed checks are rare.

Tolls
Entire stretch charges tolls. Toll system not networked.

Lanes
4 lanes (2 up, 2 down) throughout.

Surface conditions
Moderately good.

Traffic
Traffic conditions to Zhangjiakou from Beijing: Very good.
Traffic conditions to Beijing from Zhangjiakou: Good.

Major exits
Donghuayuan, Huailai, Jimingyi, Xiahuayuan, Zhangjiakou.

Service areas
Guanting Service Area is next to the Guanting Bridge.

Connections
Badaling Expressway: Becomes the Badaling Expressway 60 km from Beijing.

Xuanda Expressway: Becomes the Xuanda Expressway after Exit No. 5 (if one does not change direction). The Jingzhang Expressway actually spins off to the right; if one continues straight ahead, one heads for Datong in Shanxi province instead.

List of exits

Symbols: ↗ = exit, ⇆ = main interchange; ¥ = central toll gate; S = service area

Listed are exits heading west and northwest from Beijing (City Limits Toll Gate)

 Continues from Badaling Expressway
 ¥ Beijing City Limits Toll Gate
 ↗ 1: Donghuayuan (Exit No. 1)
 Guanting Reservoir Bridge
 S Guanting Service Area
 ↗ 2: Chicheng, Huailai (Shacheng)
 ↗ 3: Jimingyi
 ↗ 4: Xiahuayuan
 ¥ Daijiaying
 ⇆ 5: (Interchange with Xuanda Expressway) Zhangjiakou, Banpojie
 ↗ Zhangjiakou

References 

Expressways in China
Road transport in Beijing
Transport in Hebei

zh:京张高速公路